Svein Magnus Munkejord (born 26 September 1948) is a Norwegian politician for the Conservative Party. He was personal secretary to the Minister of Fisheries 1981–1983, state secretary to the Minister of Fisheries 1984–1985, and Minister of Fisheries 1989–1990.

References

1948 births
Living people
Government ministers of Norway